Chris Davis (born November 8, 1979) is a former American football fullback.

High school
Davis attended Hillsborough High School in (Tampa, Florida) where he was a three-time letterman and team captain as a senior.

College
After redshirting in 1998, Davis played the next four years.  In the 2000 preseason, he changed positions from running back to fullback.  Davis played in every game of his final three seasons.

Prior to the NFL Draft, Davis was measured with a 4.49 second 40-yard dash, a 37 1/2-inch vertical jump, while bench pressing 430 pounds.

Professional football
The Seattle Seahawks drafted Davis in the fifth round of the 2003 NFL Draft via a draft pick acquired from the Green Bay Packers. Davis attended Syracuse University.  He played in one game in the 2003 season.

References

External links
 
 Syracuse Profile
 FoxSports CFB Profile
 Sports Reference Pro Profile

1979 births
Living people
Syracuse Orange football players
Seattle Seahawks players
American football running backs
Players of American football from Tampa, Florida